Dauberville Bridge was a historic concrete arch bridge spanning the Schuylkill River between Centre Township and Ontelaunee Township in Berks County, Pennsylvania. It was a multiple span , concrete arch bridge with four spans, constructed in 1908. The bridge was demolished and replaced in 1991.

It was listed on the National Register of Historic Places in 1988.

See also
List of bridges documented by the Historic American Engineering Record in Pennsylvania

References

External links

Historic American Engineering Record in Pennsylvania
Road bridges on the National Register of Historic Places in Pennsylvania
Bridges completed in 1909
Bridges in Berks County, Pennsylvania
Schuylkill River
Dauberville
National Register of Historic Places in Berks County, Pennsylvania
Concrete bridges in the United States
Arch bridges in the United States